Camelot Management Consultants AG is an international consulting firm with focus on Supply Chain Management. 320 consultants work directly for Camelot Management Consultants and around 1.400 consultants work in Camelot's partner organizations in eight branch offices. CEO of Camelot Management Consultants is Josef Packowski.

Services 
Camelot Management Consultants is specialized in Value Chain Management in the core industries Chemicals & Petrochemicals, Pharmaceuticals & Life Sciences and Consumer Goods. The company combines management consulting and implementation in the areas of (excerpt): Supply Chain Management, Finance & Performance Management, Sourcing & Procurement, Logistics & Distribution, Master Data Management, Transport Management and Strategic Information Management.

LEAN Supply Chain Planning 

Camelot Management Consultants has developed a Supply Chain Management approach LEAN Supply Chain Planning. T

Awards 
Camelot Management Consultants has received several awards in the last years. In 2012 the management consultancy received an award in the category “Supply Chain Management” in the competition “Best of Consulting” run by the German business magazine Wirtschaftswoche, in 2013 the technology partner Camelot ITLab was honored for the best “IT Management” in the competition. In 2014 Camelot Management Consultants also received the award by brandeins in the competition “Beste Berater 2014 (Best Consultants 2014)”. In 2013, Camelot Management Consultants was awarded as “Top Consultant” for being one of the best mid-sized consulting firm. The Hochschule Bonn-Rhein-Sieg awarded the unit Camelot ITLab 2014 with the certificate “Top-Consultant” for one of the best IT consultancy firms. In 2014 Camelot ITLab also received the “INNOVATIONSPREIS-IT” in the category “Best of ERP 2014”.

External links 
Official website
Official website LEAN Supply Chain Planning

References 

Management consulting firms of Germany
Consulting firms established in 1996
Supply chain management
1996 establishments in Germany
Companies based in Baden-Württemberg